Mozambique competed at the 2018 Commonwealth Games in the Gold Coast, Australia from 4 to 15 April 2018.

Competitors
The following is the list of number of competitors participating at the Games per sport/discipline.

Athletics

Men
Track & road events

Women
Field events

Basketball

Mozambique qualified a women's basketball teams of 12 athletes. The team qualified after being ranked in the top three in the Commonwealth (besides the host nation, Australia).

Women's tournament

Roster

Pool A

Qualifying finals

Finished in sixth place overall

Beach volleyball

Mozambique received a wild card for a men's beach volleyball team of two athletes.

Boxing

Mozambique participated with a team of 2 athletes (1 man and 1 woman). Carlos Mucamba who was originally on the team was not a part of the draw, and thus did not compete.

Cycling

Mozambique participated with 1 athlete (1 man).

Road
Men

Swimming

Mozambique participated with 5 athletes (5 men).

Men

See also
Mozambique at the 2018 Summer Youth Olympics

References

Nations at the 2018 Commonwealth Games
Mozambique at the Commonwealth Games
Com